Prentice Hall was an American major educational publisher owned by Savvas Learning Company. Prentice Hall publishes print and digital content for the 6–12 and higher-education market, and distributes its technical titles through the Safari Books Online e-reference service.

History
On October 13, 1913, law professor Charles Gerstenberg and his student Richard Ettinger founded Prentice Hall. Gerstenberg and Ettinger took their mothers' maiden names, Prentice and Hall, to name their new company. Prentice Hall became known as a publisher of trade books by authors such as Norman Vincent Peale; elementary, secondary, and college textbooks; loose-leaf information services; and professional books. Prentice Hall acquired the training provider Deltak in 1979.

Prentice Hall was acquired by Gulf+Western in 1984, and became part of that company's publishing division Simon & Schuster. S&S sold several Prentice Hall subsidiaries: Deltak and Resource Systems were sold to National Education Center. Reston Publishing was closed.

In 1989, Prentice Hall Information Services was sold to Macmillan Inc. In 1990, Prentice Hall Press, a trade book publisher, was moved to Simon & Schuster Trade and Prentice Hall's reference & travel was moved to Simon & Schuster's mass market unit. Publication of trade books ended in 1991. In 1994, Gulf+Western successor Paramount was sold to Viacom. Prentice Hall Legal & Financial Services was sold to CSC Networks and CDB Infotek. Wolters Kluwer acquired Prentice Hall Law & Business. Simon & Schuster's educational division, including Prentice Hall, was sold to Pearson plc by G+W successor Viacom in 1998. Subsequently, Pearson absorbed Prentice Hall's higher education and technical reference titles into Pearson Education. Pearson sold its K-12 educational publishing in the United States in 2019; the division was renamed Savvas Learning. K-12 and school titles of Prentice Hall were absorbed into Savvas Learning (along with Prentice Hall web domains which redirected to Savvas Learning homepage).

Notable titles 
Prentice Hall is the publisher of Magruder's American Government as well as Biology by Ken Miller and Joe Levine, and Sociology and Society: The Basics by John Macionis. Their artificial intelligence series includes Artificial Intelligence: A Modern Approach by Stuart J. Russell and Peter Norvig and ANSI Common Lisp by Paul Graham. They also published the well-known computer programming book The C Programming Language by Brian Kernighan and Dennis Ritchie and Operating Systems: Design and Implementation by Andrew S. Tanenbaum. Winthrop Publishers, a Cambridge, Massachusetts based subsidiary of Prentice Hall, published a series of books on programming beginning in the mid-1970s that was edited by Richard W. Conway. Other titles include Dennis Nolan's Big Pig (1976), Monster Bubbles: A Counting Book (1976), Alphabrutes (1977), Wizard McBean and his Flying Machine (1977), Witch Bazooza (1979), Llama Beans (1979, with author Charles Keller, and The Joy of Chickens (1981).

In "personal computer" history
A Prentice Hall subsidiary, Reston Publishing, was in the foreground of technical-book publishing when microcomputers were first becoming  available. It was still unclear who would be buying and using "personal computers", and the scarcity of useful software and instruction created a publishing market niche whose target audience yet had to be defined. In the spirit of the pioneers who made PCs possible, Reston Publishing's editors addressed non-technical users with the reassuring, and mildly experimental, Computer Anatomy for Beginners by Marlin Ouverson of People's Computer Company. They followed with a collection of books that was generally by and for programmers, building a stalwart list of titles relied on by many in the first generation of microcomputers users.

See also 
 Prentice Hall International Series in Computer Science

References

External links 
 
 Pearson Higher Education (formerly Prentice Hall Higher Education) website
 Prentice Hall Professional Technical Reference website

Educational publishing companies of the United States
Book publishing companies based in New Jersey
Computer book publishing companies
Educational book publishing companies
Textbook publishing companies
Companies based in Bergen County, New Jersey
Publishing companies established in 1913
1913 establishments in New Jersey
Former Viacom subsidiaries
American companies established in 1913